Skilling v. United States, 561 U.S. 358 (2010), is a United States Supreme Court case interpreting the honest services fraud statute, . The case involves former Enron CEO Jeffrey Skilling and the honest services fraud statute, which prohibits "a scheme or artifice to deprive another of the intangible right of honest services".  The Court found the statute vague, meaning it was written in a manner that almost anyone could be convicted of the statute by engaging in most legal activities.  However, the Court refused to void the statute as unconstitutionally vague.  The Court decided to limit the application of the statute only to defendants who hold a fiduciary duty and they participate in bribery and kickback schemes. The Court supported its decision not to rule the statute void for vagueness on its obligation to construe and not condemn Congress' laws.  Ultimately, Skilling's sentence was reduced by 10 years as a result.

Companion cases
In light of the court's findings, a similar case, Weyhrauch v. United States, involving former Alaska representative Bruce Weyhrauch, was returned to the United States Court of Appeals for the Ninth Circuit, where federal charges were eventually dropped.

The Supreme Court heard the Skilling case along with the similar Black v. United States (2010).

Notes

References 
Amanda Becker, Lawyers prepare to reopen 'honest services' cases in wake of Supreme Court ruling, Washington Post, August 9, 2010
Artur Davis, Court could redefine insider trading. MarketWatch, March 11, 2011  
Nicholas J. Wagoner, Honest-Services Fraud: The Supreme Court Defuses the Government's Weapon of Mass Discretion in Skilling v. United States, South Texas Law Review, Vol. 51, No. 4 (Winter 2010), p. 1121 
Thomas P. Cimino, Jr., Junaid A. Zubairi, Rachel C. Adamczyk, Rachel T. Copenhaver, Vedder Price, Supreme Court Limits Scope of “Honest Services” Statute – Skilling v. United States. National Law Review, September 8, 2010
Justice Department Seeks a Broader Fraud Law to Cover Self-Dealing, New York Times, September 28, 2010
Wesley Burrell, The Right-to-Honest-Services Doctrine—Enron’s Final Victim: Pure Void-for-Vagueness in Skilling v. United States, 44 Loy. L.A. L. Rev. 1289 (2011). Available at: http://digitalcommons.lmu.edu/llr/vol44/iss3/19

External links
 

Honest services fraud case law
Void for vagueness case law
United States Sixth Amendment jury case law
2010 in United States case law
United States Supreme Court cases
United States Supreme Court cases of the Roberts Court
Enron scandal